The Institutes may refer to the following written works:

 Institutes of Justinian, part of the Justinian Code
 Institutes of Gaius, legal textbook, written about 161 AD
 The Institutes of Biblical Law by Rousas Rushdoony
 Institutes of the Christian Religion, a work by John Calvin
 The Institutes of Grammar, the standard medieval Latin textbook, written by Priscian in late antiquity

See also 
 Institutiones (disambiguation)